The first season of the Croatian reality television series MasterChef Croatia began on 21 March 2011 and aired on Nova TV, concluding on 17 June 2011 when Šime Sušić was crowned the winner. The season was hosted by Jasna Nanut.

Judges 

The judges in the first season were Tomislav Gretić, famous Croatian cook, Mate Janković, one of the youngest Croatian cooks and Radovan Marčić, director, writer and a food critic.

Show 

During the first two weeks, there were elimination rounds. Jury had to make a decision and choose the best 20.

The show was aired every week from Monday to Friday. Every Monday, the contestants got a "kutija iznenađenja" (Mystery Box). In the box, candidates got a few ingredients and they had to make a dish from these ingredients. The best contestant was awarded by selecting the main ingredient for the "test kreativnosti" (Creativity Test), which was every Tuesday. Candidate, who was the best in the test of creativity, was given the opportunity to cook versus one of the masterchefs in Croatia. The duel between the candidate and the chef was every Thursday. The three worst candidates in the test of creativity were given a penalty; "stres test" (stress test). Candidate, who was the worst in the stress test was eliminated. Every Friday, candidates were divided into two teams. Every team had a leader. The jury selected the leaders. Teams were taken to the challenge. Team that lost had to face a new challenge in the form of an elimination test. Candidate who was the worse had to leave the show.

 The contestant won the competition
 The contestant was eliminated
 The contestant was awarded by selecting the main ingredient for a test of creativity
 The contestant was given the opportunity to cook versus one of the masterchefs in Croatia
 The contestant cooked versus one of the masterchefs in Croatia and won and in that way got immunity.
 The contestant was one of the team leaders
 The contestant was one of the team leaders and was awarded by selecting the main ingredient for a test of creativity
 The contestant nearly left the competition
 The contestant was the worst in the challenge and got a penalty
 The contestant was the worst in the challenge, got a penalty and was eliminated
 The contestant was one of the team leaders and nearly left the competition
 The contestant was awarded and got to select the main ingredient for a test of creativity and was eliminated
 The contestant was awarded and got to select the main ingredient for a test of creativity and got a penalty
 The contestant was one of the team leaders and was eliminated
 The contestant was one of the team leaders and decided to withdraw from the competition.

References

External links
Official Website (in Croatian)

Croatia (season 1)
2011 Croatian television seasons